Jonathan Antenor de Moura Almeida, better known as Preto is a Brazilian footballer, who plays as a striker for Cuiabá.

References

(NEEDED)

External links
(NEEDED)

1986 births
Brazilian footballers
Living people
Ceará Sporting Club players
Ipatinga Futebol Clube players
Mirassol Futebol Clube players
Clube de Regatas Brasil players
Association football forwards
Sportspeople from Rio de Janeiro (state)